Edgar Taylor (28 January 1793– 19 August 1839) was a British solicitor and author of legal, historical, literary works and translations. He was the first translator of Kinder- und Hausmärchen published in 1812 by the Brothers Grimm, into English, as German Popular Stories in 1823. In 1826 he translated the second volume (1814) of the Kinder- und Hausmärchen .

Life
He was the fifth son of Samuel Taylor, who was a grandson of John Taylor, born at Banham, Norfolk, on 28 January 1793. He was at school at Palgrave under Charles Lloyd. In 1809 he was articled to his uncle, Meadows Taylor, a solicitor of Diss, Norfolk. He had mastered Italian and Spanish before coming to London in 1814; subsequently he learnt German and French.

In 1817, with Robert Roscoe, a son of William Roscoe, Taylor set up the firm of Taylor & Roscoe, solicitors, in King's Bench Walk, Inner Temple. His legal career prospered, mainly in equity practice, was prosperous. Contracting in 1827 an incurable disease, he was compelled (from 1832) to give up much of his professional work.

After long suffering, Taylor died at Bedford Row, London on 19 August 1839, and was buried in Highgate cemetery.

Nonconformist
Taylor was an original member of the "Noncon Club", founded in July 1817 by Robert Aspland to advance religious freedom, and co-operated with Aspland in ecclesiastical politics, working for the legal recognition of the rights of nonconformists. As a dissenting deputy he took part in the movement for repeal (1828) of the Test and Corporation Acts; in 1837 he was appointed a commissioner (unpaid) for carrying out the Dissenters' Marriage Act.

Works
During 1823–6 Taylor's (anonymous) translations from the Kinder- und Hausmärchen of Jacob and Wilhelm Grimm were published as German Popular Stories, with illustrations by George Cruikshank. Taylor wrote to the Grimms that he created the translations with 'the amusement of some young friends principally in view'. A second edition, entitled Gammer Grethel, or German Fairy Tales and Popular Stories, appeared in 1839. It had illustrations by Cruikshank and Ludwig Emil Grimm. Jack Zipes regards Taylor's translations as representative of a more general movement gathering support in the 1820s, and tending to separate the fantasy elements of fairy tales from cruelty and bawdy, with the addition of Christian teaching. Taylor's English edition was more popular than the Grimms' first edition, which was more scholarly. "The popularity of German Popular Stories helped to make fairy tales an acceptable form of children's literature in England, according to Jan Susina.

Among Taylor's other publications were:

 Lays of the Minne-singers … with Historical and Critical Notices, 1825 (illustrated).
 The Book of Rights, 1833; a digest of constitutional law, with comments.
 Master Wace his Chronicle of the Norman Conquest, from the "Roman de Rou", translated with Notes, 1837; the notes were appended to Alexander Malet's translation, 1860.

Posthumous were:

 The Suffolk Bartholomeans, a Memoir of John Meadowe, 1840; this work was  edited by his sister Emily Taylor.
 The New Testament … revised from the Authorised Version … by a Layman, 1840, edited by William Hincks.

Taylor wrote in The Jurist, Legal Observer, Retrospective Review, Westminster Review, and Morning Chronicle. Among his contributions to the Monthly Repository were a Memoir (1819) of Johann Jakob Wettstein, the biblical critic; and Observations on Mahometanism (1820).

Family
Taylor married, in 1823, Ann, daughter of John Christie of Hackney, who survived him, with an only daughter.

References

External links 
 
  Translated by Edgar Taylor and Marian Edwardes.
 
 
 German popular stories at Google Books A facsimile of the translation by Edgar Taylor and Marian Edwardes.

Attribution

1793 births
1839 deaths
People from Breckland District